Satellite Football Club is a Guinean football club whose team plays in the Ligue 1 Pro. Their home games are played at the 25,000-capacity Stade 28 Septembre in Conakry.

Achievements

National
Guinée Championnat National: 2
Champion: 2002, 2005

Guinée Coupe Nationale: 2
Winner: 2006, 2008

Guinée Super Coupe: 1
Winner: 2008

 Tournoi Ruski Alumini: 3
Winner: 2001, 2004, 2006

Performance in CAF competitions
 CAF Champions League
2003 – First Round
2006 – Preliminary Round

 CAF Confederation Cup
2007 – First Round
2008 – First Round
2009 – First Round

 CAF Cup
2002 – Second Round

References

Football clubs in Guinea
Association football clubs established in 2000
2000 establishments in Guinea